REAL Server is a relational database management system (RDBMS) built on top of the SQLite database engine.

History
REAL Server evolved from the SQLiteServer originally developed by SQLabs in 2004. In May 2005 Real Software, Inc., creator of Realbasic, purchased the source code and the copyrights of the SQLiteServer and invested in its development. In 2007/2008 the first version of the REAL SQL Server was released. A new version was released in April 2009 and renamed REAL Server. In September 2010 SQLabs repurchased all the server's Intellectual Properties and a new major release is now under development by the SQLabs team.

Features

 Event based,
 Asynchronous sockets,
 Multi-core and multiprocessor aware,
 Strong AES encryption (128, 192 and 256 bit),
 Supports unlimited connections (For each supported operating system, REAL Server uses a state of the art event API, kqueue on Mac OS X, epool on Linux and I/O Completion Ports on Windows),
 Full ACID (Atomic, Consistent, Isolated, Durable) compliant,
 Platform independent storage engine,
 Full support of triggers and transactions,
 Journal engine for crash recovery,
 Supports databases of 2 terabytes,
 Supports sqlite 3 databases,
 Automatic logging,
 Automatic compression,
 Multiversion concurrency control (MVCC),
 Plugins for extending the SQL language and the custom commands supported by the server,
 Restore and backup support,
 Mac OS X, Windows and Linux support.

Connectivity
REAL Server can be used with the following:
 Realbasic
 PHP
 C SDK
 ODBC

External links
 SQLabs.
 REAL Server, Official REAL Server website

References

Relational database management systems